Kevin Carson is an American political writer and blogger. While he originally identified as a mutualist, he now describes himself as an anarchist without adjectives. He works as a Senior Fellow and Karl Hess Chair in Social Theory at the Center for a Stateless Society. Carson coined the pejorative term "vulgar libertarianism" to describe the use of free market rhetoric in defense of corporate capitalism and economic inequality.

Selected works
 Studies in Mutualist Political Economy (2007)
 Organization Theory: A Libertarian Perspective (2008)
 The Homebrew Industrial Revolution: A Low-Overhead Manifesto (2010)
 The Desktop Regulatory State: The Countervailing Power of Individuals and Networks (2016)
 Capitalist Nursery Fables (2020)
 Exodus: General Idea of the Revolution in the XXI Century (2021)

See also

 Anarchist economics

References

External links

 
 
 Kevin Carson on Academia.edu
 Kevin Carson on Center for a Stateless Society
 Kevin Carson on The Anarchist Library
 Kevin Carson's blog on P2P Foundation

Living people
21st-century American essayists
21st-century American male writers
21st-century American non-fiction writers
American anarchists
American anti-capitalists
American libertarians
American male non-fiction writers
American political writers
Anarchist theorists
Anarchist writers
Anarchists without adjectives
Free-market anarchists
Individualist anarchists
Left-libertarians
Libertarian theorists
Mutualists
Year of birth missing (living people)